Gábor Verőci (born 22 October 1953 in Budapest)  is a former Hungarian handball player who competed in the 1976 Summer Olympics.

In 1976 he was part of the Hungarian team which finished sixth in the Olympic tournament. He played all five matches as goalkeeper.

References

1953 births
Living people
Hungarian male handball players
Olympic handball players of Hungary
Handball players at the 1976 Summer Olympics
Handball players from Budapest